Eas Mor is a waterfall is a waterfall on the Abhainn Ghil on the island of Islay in Scotland. It lies on The Oa peninsula south of Giol and west of Lenavore.

See also
Waterfalls of Scotland

References

Waterfalls of Islay